Thomas Waddell (born 9 September 1870 in Glasgow) was a Scottish footballer, who played for Queen's Park and Scotland.

References

Sources

External links

London Hearts profile

1870 births
Year of death missing
Scottish footballers
Scotland international footballers
Corinthian F.C. players
Queen's Park F.C. players
Association football wingers